Azizi bin Matt Rose (born 6 November 1981) is a Malaysian footballer who plays as a defender and currently a Perlis United F.C. player.

Club career

Perlis FA
Azizi Matt Rose began his career in football by playing for Perlis President Cup team, after he managed to be inhaled by the management team. He successfully promoted into the Perlis senior squad. At that time Perlis was Malaysia football respected team in 2002-2006. He was selected to play Asian Cup 2007.

PDRM FA
He joined the PDRM in the 2007 season. With that team, he successfully led the team to win the Malaysia Premier League, and play in the Malaysia Super League for the next year. However, not long after that, he left the team the following year.

Kuala Muda Naza
He rejoined Perlis in 2008. However, he went out and joined a new team from Kedah, KM Naza. With his new team, he successfully led the team to win the Malaysia Premier League and led the team reached the FA Cup semi-final.

T-Team FC
He together with Indra Putra and Nor Farhan Muhammad leaving Kelantan at the end of 2010 after Kelantan won their first Malaysia Cup. The trio joined the club from Terengganu, T-Team. Together with T-Team, he is the key player of the team to the semi-finals of the Malaysia Cup and create clean record against Selangor during the 2011 season.

Kelantan FA
He played superbly while playing for Kelantan. He has always been a key player in the team every game. Kelantan won the Malaysia Cup for the first time in 2010 and he played well in that historic game. He return to Kelantan after the a season with T-Team. Last May he had undergone ACL surgery and was sidelined for six months. He has been undergoing treatment at the National Sports Council (NSC), Kuala Lumpur. Expected to be back playing at the beginning of 2013.

Club statistics

Club

Honours

Club

Johor Darul Takzim
 Malaysia Super League: 2014

Kelantan
 Malaysia Super League: 2011, 2012; Runner-up 2010
 Malaysia Cup: 2010, 2012; Runner-up 2009, 2013
 Malaysia FA Cup: 2012, 2013; Runner-up 2011, 2009
 Malaysia Charity Shield: 2011; Runner-up 2012, 2013

References

External links
 
 Azizi Matt Rose at SoccerPunter.com
 

1981 births
Living people
Malaysian footballers
Malaysian people of Malay descent
Malaysian Muslims
Malaysia international footballers
Kuala Muda Naza F.C. players
Perlis FA players
PDRM FA players
Terengganu F.C. II players
Kelantan FA players
People from Perlis
Johor Darul Ta'zim F.C. players
Negeri Sembilan FA players
Malaysia Super League players
Association football defenders